Music is a Hungry Ghost is an album by the German post-rock group To Rococo Rot in collaboration with the New York City turntablist I-Sound. It was released on May 8, 2001 and was the band's first album for the Mute Records label.

Track listing
All songs written by I-Sound and To Rococo Rot.
 "A Number of Things" – 4:16
 "For a Moment" – 4:35
 "How We Never Went to Bed" – 4:18
 "First" – 2:30
 "From Dream to Daylight" – 4:14
 "Your Secrets, a Few Words" – 3:14
 "Along the Route" – 2:57
 "Overhead" – 4:09
 "Koko" – 0:38
 "Pantone" – 2:59
 "Mazda in the Mist" – 4:22
 "She Tended to Forget" – 2:30
 "The Trance of Travel" – 5:00

External links
 Music is a Hungry Ghost at Metacritic

References 

2001 albums
Mute Records albums
To Rococo Rot albums